FlaK may refer to:
 Preflagellin peptidase, an enzyme
 Anti-aircraft warfare, another term for air defense